Mokotów Field (Polish: Pole Mokotowskie) is a large park in Warsaw, Poland. A part of the parkland is called Józef Piłsudski Park.

Located between Warsaw's Mokotów district and the city center, the park is one of the largest in Warsaw. Contrary to its name, only a small part of the modern Mokotów Field is located in the Mokotów district. Most of the field (48.61 ha, almost 71%) is located in Ochota and the City Center. 

Located within the park is the Polish National Library. The park is also famous for its bars. Just to the south is a Warsaw Metro station, the Pole Mokotowskie station.

From 1818 till World War II, on what was originally a 200ha area, a major part was occupied by an airfield and the Warsaw Polytechnic aircraft works. The Mokotów Field was also, until 1934, the site of Warsaw Airport and, in the years 1884-1939, of the Warsaw Horse Racing Track.

On May 17, 1935, the funeral of Józef Piłsudski took place on the Mokotów Fields.

The current park was designed by Stanisław Bolek and created in the 1970s and 1980s.

In 2010, a two-kilometer educational trail was opened named after Ryszard Kapuściński. In 2018, near the intersection of al. Niepodległości and ul. Wawelska Street, 45 apple trees were planted to commemorate prominent Polish women.

See also 

 Parks in Warsaw

Mokotów
 Ochota

Notes

Mokotów
Parks in Warsaw
Ochota